Scaldback (Arnoglossus kessleri) is a species of bottom feeder benthic flatfish belonging to the family Bothidae. It is widespread in the Mediterranean and the Black Sea.

References

External links 
 

Fish described in 1915
Fish of the Mediterranean Sea
Fish of the Black Sea
Marine fish of Europe
Scaldfish